Mahakam Bridge is a bridge that crosses the Mahakam River in Samarinda, East Kalimantan province, Indonesia.

Mahakam Bridge was built in 1987 and inaugurated by the President of Indonesia, Soeharto.

References 

Bridges in Indonesia
Buildings and structures in East Kalimantan
Transport in East Kalimantan
Bridges completed in 1987